Dorothy Elizabeth Anne "Dot" Brookshaw (December 20, 1912 – September 3, 1962) was a Canadian athlete who competed mainly in the 100 metres.

She competed for Canada in the 1936 Summer Olympics held in Berlin, Germany in the 4 x 100 metres where she won the bronze medal with her teammates Mildred Dolson, Hilda Cameron and Aileen Meagher.

References

External links 
 
 

1912 births
1962 deaths
Canadian female sprinters
Athletes from Toronto
Athletes (track and field) at the 1936 Summer Olympics
Canadian people of English descent
Olympic track and field athletes of Canada
Olympic bronze medalists for Canada
Medalists at the 1936 Summer Olympics
Olympic bronze medalists in athletics (track and field)
Olympic female sprinters